Andrzej Zbigniew Biernat (born August 11, 1960) is a Polish politician and a member of the Civic Platform party. He served as Minister of Sport and Tourism from November 2013 to June 2015, and he has been a member of the Sejm since September 2005. Prior to his involvement in politics, he worked as teacher in an elementary school and the director of a sports centre in Konstantynów Łódzki.

He was first elected to the Sejm on September 25, 2005, getting 6244 votes in 11 Sieradz district, from the Civic Platform list.

See also
Members of Polish Sejm 2005-2007

References

External links
Andrzej Biernat - parliamentary page - includes declarations of interest, voting record, and transcripts of speeches.

Members of the Polish Sejm 2005–2007
Civic Platform politicians
Movement for Reconstruction of Poland politicians
1960 births
Living people
Government ministers of Poland
Jan Długosz University alumni
Members of the Polish Sejm 2007–2011
Members of the Polish Sejm 2011–2015
People from Kraśnik County